Hettinger may refer to:
 Hettinger, North Dakota
 Hettinger County, North Dakota
 Hettinger Township, Adams County, North Dakota
 A resident of Hettingen, Germany
 Hettinger (surname)